"Any Fule Kno That" is the first song on the 1998 album Abandon by Deep Purple. Vocalist Ian Gillan takes a spoken word approach in the verses to the song, comparable to rapping. It is also one of the rare occasions in which his lyrics are explicit, in this case using the word "shit".  The unusual spelling of the title comes from the Nigel Molesworth books.

Personnel
Ian Gillan – vocals
Steve Morse – guitar
Roger Glover – bass
Jon Lord – organ
Ian Paice – drums

References

Deep Purple songs
1998 songs
Songs written by Steve Morse
Songs written by Ian Gillan
Songs written by Roger Glover
Songs written by Jon Lord
Songs written by Ian Paice
Rap rock songs